The 1998 Men's Hockey World Cup was the ninth edition of the Men's Hockey World Cup, the quadrennial world championship for men's national field hockey teams organized by the International Hockey Federation. It was held  alongside the women's tournament in Utrecht, Netherlands from 20 June to 1 July 1998.

The trophy was won by the Netherlands national field hockey team. Spain came second and Germany came third. The Dutch made history by being the only country to win a tournament at its home ground not only once, but twice. It was the second time The Netherlands had hosted the competition.

Location
The 9th Hockey World Cup was held in Galgenwaard Stadium at Utrecht, Netherlands. The stadium was opened in 1982, and was mainly used for football, and was the home of the football club FC Utrecht. The stadium has a capacity of around 24,500 spectators, and at the time it was one of the most modern stadiums in the world. The stadium was the host of two World Cup finals: the first, was the Hockey World Cup final; and the second was in 2005, for the final of the Football World Youth Championships.

Qualification

Squads

Group stage

Pool A

Pool B

Classification round

Ninth to twelfth place classification

Ninth to twelfth qualifiers

Eleventh and twelfth place

Ninth and tenth place

Fifth to eighth place classification

Fifth to eighth qualifiers

Seventh and eighth place

Fifth and sixth place

First to fourth place classification

Semi-finals

Third and fourth place

Final

Awards

Final standings

See also
1998 Men's Hockey Champions Trophy
1998 Women's Hockey World Cup

References

External links
FIH page on the 1998 Men's Hockey World Cup
Rediff page

 
Men's Hockey World Cup
World Cup
International field hockey competitions hosted by the Netherlands
Hockey World Cup Men
Hockey World Cup Men
Hockey World Cup Men
Sports competitions in Utrecht (city)